Lobscouse (or lapskaus) is a thick Scandinavian stew made of meat and potatoes.

There are many variations of lapskaus. The dish may be made of fresh or leftover meat (usually beef or lamb, but sometimes also chicken, pork, or ham) and potatoes. Other typical ingredients are vegetables (such as carrots, onions, leeks, celery root, and rutabaga) and spices (such as salt, pepper, ginger, and herbs).

Lapskaus is possibly linked (historically and etymologically) to lobscouse, a European sailors' stew or hash strongly associated with major ports such as Liverpool. Similar dishes include the Danish , Swedish , Finnish  or the German .

The dish also figures in Norwegian American cuisine. In 1970, lapskaus was part of "the official menu for the seamen's mess" of the Norwegian America Line. Until the 1980s, Brooklyn's Eighth Avenue (particularly between 50th and 60th streets) was known as "Lapskaus Boulevard" in reference to the high Norwegian-American population in the area.

See also

References

Further reading
 
 
 

Norwegian cuisine
Norwegian stews
Meat and potatoes dishes